Kondrakovo is a rural locality (a settlement) in Borisoglebskoye Rural Settlement, Muromsky District, Vladimir Oblast, Russia. The population was 373 as of 2010. There are 8 streets.

Geography 
Kondrakovo is located 33 km north of Murom (the district's administrative centre) by road. Talyzino is the nearest rural locality.

References 

Rural localities in Muromsky District
Muromsky Uyezd